Ideogram was a stainless steel sculpture in New York City by American sculptor James Rosati, completed in 1972. The work consisted of a number of intersecting beams with reflective surfaces.

Located between the Twin Towers, in front of the Marriott World Trade Center, the work was lost in the September 11 attacks. Though the sculpture may have survived the attacks and collapse of the buildings, its steel material was indistinguishable from the Ground Zero rubble. As a result, the sculpture was never recovered, and its remains were removed from Ground Zero along with the rest of the rubble. 

According to Saul Wenegrat, former director of the art program for the Port Authority, the sculpture may have been the most photographed piece of art in the World Trade Center Complex. It was also featured in many fashion advertisements.

Gallery

See also
 Artwork damaged or destroyed in the September 11 attacks

References

1972 sculptures
1972 establishments in New York City
2001 disestablishments in New York (state)
Artworks in the World Trade Center
Destroyed sculptures

Stainless steel sculptures in the United States